Isakkinte Ithihasam (English:The Epic of Isak) is a 2019 Comedy-Suspense-Drama Malayalam Film directed by R. K. Ajayakumar under the banner of Uma Maheshwara Creations Produced by Ayyappan R. It was written by Subash and R. K. Ajayakumar, with music by Gopi Sundar and cinematography by T. D. Sreenivas. It stars Siddique, who plays the title role of Isak and the story happens in the picturesque village of Thodupuzha. The film was released on 30 August 2019.

Cast
 Siddique as Isak
 Ashokan
 Bhagath Manuel
 Kalabhavan Shajohn
 Saju Navodaya
 Nelson
 Sasi Kalinga 
 Sunidhi
 Sona Heiden
 Naseer Sankranthi

References

External links
 

2019 films
2010s Malayalam-language films